Sohrevardi Metro Station is a station in line 3 of the Tehran Metro.  It is located next to the interchange of Behesti Street with Sohrevardi Street.

References

Tehran Metro stations
Railway stations opened in 2015
2015 establishments in Iran